AB-FUBINACA is a drug that acts as a potent agonist for the cannabinoid receptors, with Ki values of 0.9 nM at CB1 and 23.2 nM at CB2 and EC50 values of 1.8 nM at CB1 and 3.2 nM at CB2. It was originally developed by Pfizer in 2009 as an analgesic medication but was never pursued for human use. In 2012, it was discovered as an ingredient in synthetic cannabinoid blends in Japan, along with a related compound AB-PINACA, which had not previously been reported.

Its use has been linked to hospitalizations and deaths.

Legality
It was designated as a Schedule I controlled substance in the United States in January 2014.

It is an Anlage II controlled substance in Germany as of November 2014.

Since October 2015 AB-FUBINACA is a controlled substance in China .

In December 2019, the UNODC announced scheduling recommendations placing AB-FUBINACA as a controlled research chemical into Schedule II.
101789

Mass overdoses due to adulterated K2 

On August 15th, 2018, 70 people within the city of New Haven, Connecticut started overdosing near Yale University campus. By the end of the week, the total number of overdosed had risen to over 100 people needing transport to local emergency rooms. Three men were arrested, charged as drug dealers selling synthetic cannabis which contained AB-FUBINACA.  First responders concluded that the overdoses were caused by opiate adulterants, as victims responded to Narcan.   Almost all of the overdoses occurred on the New Haven Green, a large downtown park that is heavily traveled and very popular with the homeless population.  There have been no deaths associated with these overdoses; however, several victims were in critical or life-threatening condition for a period of time.

See also 

 5F-AB-PINACA
 5F-ADB
 5F-AMB
 5F-APINACA
 AB-CHFUPYCA
 AB-CHMINACA
 AB-PINACA
 ADB-CHMINACA
 ADB-FUBINACA
 ADBICA
 AMB-FUBINACA
 APICA
 APINACA
 Benzydamine
 MDMB-CHMICA
 MDMB-FUBINACA
 NESS-040C5
 PF-03550096
 PX-3

References 

Cannabinoids
Designer drugs
Fluoroarenes

Indazolecarboxamides